This page presents the complete history of games played by the Sporting Club Bastia since 1972.

Since its founding in 1905, the Sporting Club Bastia participated: 2 seasons the European Cup Winners' Cup, 2 seasons in the UEFA Cup (one final), and 3 seasons the UEFA Intertoto Cup (one title, one semifinal).

UEFA Cup

1977–78

1997–98

European Cup Winners' Cup

1971–72

1981–82

UEFA Intertoto Cup

1997–98

1998–99

2001–02

Statistics

By competition

By country

Notes

References 

European
Bastia